White Rabbit is the second studio album by the rock music group Egypt Central, released on May 31, 2011. The first single, "White Rabbit", was released to radio stations on February 15, 2011 and made available on digital platforms on March 1, 2011. A 30-second preview of the album was posted on the official Egypt Central YouTube channel.

Track listing

Deluxe edition bonus tracks

Bonus online pre-order track

Singles
"White Rabbit" was released as the first single from the album. The song peaked at number 17 on the U.S. Mainstream Rock chart.

"Kick Ass" was the second single from the album and peaked at number 21 on the Mainstream Rock chart. The single also contains a separate track called "Kick Off," which is a censored version of "Kick Ass" replacing the words "Kick Ass" with "Kick Off" instead. The track was also featured in the 2012 film American Reunion.

"Enemy Inside" was the third and final single released from the album. An acoustic version of the song was recorded along with the single.

Charts

Personnel
Skidd Mills – producer
Blake "Black" Allison – drums, vocals
Joey Chicago – bass guitar, vocals
John Falls – lead vocals
Jeff James – guitar, vocals

References

2011 albums
Egypt Central albums